Elis is a regional unit of Greece.

Elis may also refer to:

Places
 Ancient Elis, the ancient Greek city-state 
 Elis (city), the capital of the ancient Greek city-state
 Elis (constituency), a legislative constituency in Greece
 Elis (Arcadia), a town of ancient Arcadia, Greece
 Elis Province, a province of Greece
 Elis, Iran, a village in East Azerbaijan Province, Iran

Music
 Elis (band), a gothic metal band
 Elis (1972 album), an album by Elis Regina
 Elis (1977 album), an album by Elis Regina
 Elis (1980 album), an album by Elis Regina
 "Elis" (song), a 2001 song by Erben der Schöpfung

Other uses
 Elis (given name)
 Elis (surname)
 Elis (students), nickname for students at Yale University
 Elis (horse)
 Metropolis of Elis and Olena, Roman Catholic titular see
 Elis SA, French company, component of SBF 120 index

See also
 Elias (disambiguation)
 Ilida (municipality)
 Ellis (disambiguation)
 Elys (disambiguation)
 El Limonar International School (disambiguation)

English-language unisex given names